José Camacho may refer to:

José Antonio Camacho (born 1955), Spanish footballer and manager
José Camacho (judoka) (born 1983), Venezuelan judoka
Jose Isidro Camacho (born 1955), Filipino banker and politician